The 1928 United States presidential election in Idaho took place on November 6, 1928, as part of the 1928 United States presidential election. State voters chose four representatives, or electors, to the Electoral College, who voted for president and vice president.

Idaho was won by Republican candidate Herbert Hoover.

Results

Results by county

See also
 United States presidential elections in Idaho

References

Idaho
1928
1928 Idaho elections